Roumeliotis is a surname. Notable people with the surname include:

 Damaskinos Roumeliotis, Greek Orthodox Metropolitan of Maronia and Komotini
 Nikolaos Roumeliotis, Greek volleyball player
 Panagiotis Roumeliotis, Greek economist
 Stergios Roumeliotis, engineer at the University of Minnesota

See also
 Roúmeli, or Roumeliotes, alternate names for Central Greece